

The FF9 Kaje was a Norwegian trainer aircraft, designed and built by the Norwegian Army Air Service's  aircraft manufacturer Kjeller Flyfabrikk.

Design and development
Work on the Kaje started in 1921. It was built in three series: the Kaje I of which ten were built in 1921 and 1922, the Kaje II of which four were built in 1925 and five Kaje III in 1926. The models differed slightly in wing profile, wingspan and rudder surfaces, based on experience with the previous model.

The Kaje was a well built aircraft, constructed primarily of wood with fabric covering, with a good engine, but it had bad spin characteristics.

Operational history
Although primarily used as a training plane and for reconnaissance, the aircraft could also carry arms and was tested with radio equipment.

The aircraft was in use until the early 1930s.

Variants
Kaje ITen built.
Kaje IIFour built.
Kaje IIIFive built.

Operators

Norwegian Army Air Service

Specifications (Kaje III)

Notes

References

External links

Article about the Kaje on mil.no (Norwegian)
Norwegian aviation museum (Norwegian)
Polish page about Norwegian aircraft (Polish)

Royal Norwegian Air Force